The Mudan Dam is a dam in Mudan Township, Pingtung County, Taiwan. It forms the largest reservoir in Pingtung County.

History
The construction of the dam began in 1989 and was completed in 1995. In early November 2020, the dam released its water in preparation for the upcoming Typhoon Atsani.

Technical details
The reservoir collects water from Rureng Creek and Mudan Creek. The surface area of its catchment is 60 km2 with a total effective storage capacity of 27,930,000 m3. It supplies water for domestic and agriculture water demands in Checheng, Fangliao, Fangshan, Hengchun, Manzhou and Mudan Townships, as well as public water around Kenting National Park.

See also
 List of dams and reservoirs in Taiwan

References

1995 establishments in Taiwan
Buildings and structures in Pingtung County
Dams completed in 1995
Dams in Taiwan